Terror from the Year 5,000 (a.k.a. Cage of Doom in the UK) is a 1958 independently made American black-and-white science fiction film, produced by Robert J. Gurney Jr, Samuel Z. Arkoff, James H. Nicholson and Gene Searchinger; directed by Robert J. Gurney Jr, and starring Ward Costello, Joyce Holden, John Stratton, Salome Jens and Fred Herrick. The screenplay is based (uncredited) on the short story "Bottle Baby" by print/TV/film writer Henry Slesar that was published in the science fiction magazine Fantastic (April 1957). American International Pictures released the film as a double feature with either The Screaming Skull or The Brain Eaters.

Plot

Working in the privacy of his Florida island estate, nuclear physicist Professor Howard Erling and his assistant Victor construct a machine that transports a small statue from the future. Concerned over the vast amounts of energy needed to conduct the experiments and realizing their work needs verification from another professional, Howard calls a halt to the research, despite Victor's protests. The statue is sent to noted archeologist Bob Hedges, who determines it comes from the year 5200 A. D.

Bob learns that the statue is radioactive and attempts to contact Howard to question him about it. When he is unable to reach him by phone, Bob flies to Florida to see Howard. Upon leaving the airport Bob realizes that he is being followed. After a wild chase, Bob confronts his pursuer only to discover it is Claire Erling, Howard's daughter and Victor's fiancée. Claire is delighted by Bob's arrival and admits to sending the statue in hopes of accelerating the verification of her father's work. Claire assures Bob that neither the Erlings or Victor were aware of the radiation contamination. Claire and Bob pilot a small motorized boat out to the island when the motor dies. Claire reveals this is caused by the power drain from her father's lab. Unknown to Claire and Howard, Victor is conducting further experimentation in secret, against Howard's orders.

Howard receives Bob graciously, but Victor is resentful, suspecting that the archeologist intends to refute their work. When the guest room is discovered locked and the key missing, Victor offers to share his room with Bob until the handyman, Angelo, can provide a new key. That night, Bob hears Victor enter the guest room next door and follows as Victor removes two metal suitcases from the guest room, then takes them outside where he throws them into a pond. The next morning, Bob accepts Claire's swimming invitation and dives at the spot where Victor disposed of the suitcases. Underwater, Bob locates one suitcase and finds inside the carcass of a small animal. Later, Howard shows Bob the lab and demonstrates how he and Victor have succeeded in "trading objects with the future."

Howard sends a small bottle through the machine and receives a similar object back. Bob suggests sending something unusual and submits his fraternity key. The men are startled when a coin from the future materializes with the words "save us" in Greek engraved upon it. That night after the others retire, Victor sneaks down to the lab and continues his experiment by increasing the power level. The higher power results in a human form materializing that grabs Victor. Meanwhile, Howard and Bob investigate when Claire sees something unusual from her window. Victor manages to return the figure to the future, although he suffers a serious gash on his arm. Howard and Bob discover that Angelo has been voyeuristically watching Claire and after Bob tells Claire, he comes across spots of blood outside of the guest room door. When Bob reports Victor's unusual behavior to Howard the next morning, Howard demands evidence. Bob goes to the pond to retrieve the suitcases, but Victor intercepts him and tries to stop him. Howard, Angelo and Claire break up the men's fight and when Howard requests an explanation, Bob reveals Victor's radiation burned arm.

Despite Victor's objections, Howard, Bob, and Claire take him to the hospital, where the doctor asks them to return in a few hours to give him time to examine Victor. While the Erlings take Bob to a movie, Victor flees from the hospital and drinks at a bar until he is thrown out. A drunk Victor returns to the island, breaks into the lab, and resumes working with the machine at high power levels. Meanwhile, Howard, Bob, and Claire stop at the bar and find that Victor was there most of the afternoon. When the bar's television reception goes out, Howard realizes Victor has turned on the time machine. As the Erlings and Bob race back to the island, Victor succeeds in bringing a human form from the future, but is knocked out by the mysterious arrival. Finding Victor dazed, Howard summons a doctor who orders a nurse to come out and tend to Victor. The time traveler explores the island surroundings, but when confronted by Angelo, it kills him. Unaware of the traveler's presence, Bob succeeds in retrieving one of the metal suitcases from the pond, which contains the cadaver of a four-eyed cat.

Returning to the house, Howard and Bob stumble upon Angelo's body. After Victor tells them about the time traveler, Howard confronts Victor with the cat, declaring it the result of radiation mutation. The nurse arrives on the island and is confronted by the traveler, a woman, who addresses the nurse in Greek. When the nurse flees, the traveler attacks and kills her, then uses a device to duplicate the nurse's facial features. After gaining entrance into the Erling house, the traveler sits with Victor while the men don radiation proof gear and search for the time traveler. The traveler hypnotizes Victor to induce him to return with her to the future where his healthy genes are needed to save her people from extinction.

Attracted by noises in the lab, Claire is shocked to find Victor and the traveler revving up the time machine. In an attempt to break the hypnotic spell on Victor, Claire attacks the traveler and pulls the mask from her face, revealing her radiation-scarred features. Having discovered the faceless body of the real nurse, Howard and Bob return to the lab. They find Victor defending Claire from the traveler until he and the traveler tumble against the machine, which electrocutes and kills them both. Afterward, Bob and Claire wonder if one of them should go to the future to help. Howard insists that by changing the present they can battle against an atomic holocaust future.

Cast
 Ward Costello as Dr. Robert Hedges
 Joyce Holden as Claire Erling
 Frederic Downs as Prof. Howard Erling
 John Stratton as Victor
 Salome Jens as Future Woman / Nurse
 Fred Herrick as Angelo
 Beatrice Furdeaux as Miss Blake
 Bruce Lum as Senior Lab Technician
 Jack Diamond as First Lab Technician
 Fred Taylor as Second Lab Technician
 Bill Downs as Dr. Blair
 William Cost as Joe the Bartender

Production
Outdoor shots were filmed in and around Dade County, Florida.The working title of the film was The Girl from 5000 A.D.This is the first feature film credit for theater/film/TV actress Salome Jens.

This bears one of the earliest film editing credits for Dede Allen, who went on to a career editing such feature films as The Hustler, Bonnie and Clyde, Dog Day Afternoon, and Reds.

Beatrice Furdeaux, who has a small supporting role, was married to producer-director Robert J. Gurney Jr. She is also credited (as Beatrice Gurney) as production supervisor and co-production designer on the film.

Reception
Critic Kevin Lyons wrote that the film's "few good ideas don’t go very far," that it features "a far from interesting love triangle and a mystery that never really resolves itself satisfactorily," that it is "weary and slightly browbeaten," but also that director "Gurney is capable of isolated moments of real atmosphere and suspense." Critic Mark Hasan described the film as "the perfect synthesis of sci-fi clichés and fifties naivete, done with deadpan seriousness" and that "Gurney’s budget and his own screenwriting doom the project into a laughable Z-movie."

The film was featured on Mystery Science Theater 3000 during its eighth season (1997).

References

Bibliography
 Warren, Bill. Keep Watching the Skies: American Science Fiction Films of the Fifties'', 21st Century Edition. Jefferson, North Carolina: McFarland & Company, 2009 (First Edition 1982). .

External links
 

1950s science fiction films
1958 films
American black-and-white films
American International Pictures films
Films set in the future
Fiction set in the 6th millennium
Films about time travel
Films set in Florida
1950s English-language films